The olive pigeons are four allopatric species of pigeon, named for their association with olive (Olea) species. They have a maroon tone to the speckled plumage, and inhabit cool, montane forests of Africa and its associated islands. Together with the speckled wood pigeon, they are seen as members of a superspecies, which has affinities with the white-naped pigeon.

African olive pigeon, Columba arquatrix
Cameroon olive pigeon, Columba sjostedti
São Tomé olive pigeon, Columba thomensis
Comoros olive pigeon, Columba pollenii
Speckled wood pigeon, Columba hodgsonii, of Asia

Notes

Birds by common name